Kahlur Fort is situated in erstwhile princely state of Kahlur (also known as Bilaspur) in Himachal Pradesh.

The state was founded in/ around 697 by Bir Chand.   [CHANDEL RAJPUT RULERS] later Kahal Chand had built a fort, which was named after him, and was called Kot Kahlur. Another ruler of the state, Dip Chand founded Bilaspur, and made the place as his capital.

History

After the death of Harshaverdhna of Kanauj towards the end of seventh century A.D., Harihar Chand of Chanderi after crowned his eldest son Govind Chand set-forth on his journey northwards to follow the footsteps of his royal ancestors, Raja El Dev and Rani Bimla Devi, who were reputed to have visited Bilaspur (then Vyaspur) along with his four sons and a handful of true followers. On the way at Nadaun (headquarter of Kangra), the Katoch ruler invited the Chandel prince to encamp there for few days. A tent-pegging contest was arranged by the Kangra chief and the fourth son of Harihar Chand was killed in the contest. When the hatched plan of Kangra chief was discovered, a battle ensued and both the Kangra chief and Raja Harihar Chand were killed in the fight. Bir Chand returned back and here at Jandbari near Anandpur Sahib, he laid the foundation stone of Kahlur State in 697 AD.

Rajput architecture
Forts in Himachal Pradesh
Buildings and structures in Bilaspur district, Himachal Pradesh